Andryushchenko (Russian or Ukrainian: Андрющенко) is a gender-neutral Slavic surname that may refer to

Aleksandr Andryushchenko (born 1954), Russian football coach and former player
Vladimir Andryushchenko (born 1982), Russian Paralympic athlete 
Vyacheslav Andryushchenko (born 1989), Belarusian ice hockey player

See also
 

Ukrainian-language surnames
Patronymic surnames